The Rollins School of Public Health (RSPH) is the public health school of Emory University.  Founded in 1990, Rollins has more than 1,100 students pursuing master's degrees (MPH/MSPH) and over 150 students pursuing doctorate degrees (PhD). The school comprises six departments: Behavioral, Social, and Health Education Sciences (BSHES), Biostatistics (BIOS), Environmental Health (EH), Epidemiology (EPI), Global Health (GH), and Health Policy and Management (HPM), as well as an Executive MPH program (EMPH).

In addition to pursuing degrees from a single department, students may also participate in joint programs, both within Rollins and in conjunction with other professional schools at Emory (including Nell Hodgson Woodruff School of Nursing, Emory University School of Law, and Goizueta Business School). Unique programs to Rollins are Global Environmental Health, Global Epidemiology, and the joint EH/EPI MSPH program.

One of the founding fathers of Rollins was Dr. David Sencer, Director of the Centers for Disease Control and Prevention (CDC) from 1966 to 1977 and New York City Health Commissioner from 1981 to 1985.  In his honor, the David Sencer Scholarship Fund was established at Rollins in 2008. Rollins continues to be closely affiliated with CDC, along with multiple other public health institutions, such as the Emory Global Health Institute.

Reputation

In the most recent rankings (2022), Rollins was ranked number 4 among accredited schools and programs of public health by U.S. News & World Report, and is one of two schools of public health founded in the past 50 years to be ranked in the top 12.

Location
Atlanta is commonly referred to as the world's public health capital, and with good reason— the primary office of the CDC is located next door to Rollins, and there are a large number of other public health groups (consulting, NGO, and informatics-related) located across the city, such as Deloitte and CARE (relief agency).

Notable programs

GEMMA 
Global Elimination of Maternal Mortality from Abortion (GEMMA) is a scholarship program where eligible graduate-level students are provided opportunities in developing countries for field research and other practicums related to reproductive health, students can also utilize this scholarship to aid their research and help publish their findings associated with maternal mortality from abortion.

The GEMMA program was established by RSPH professor Dr. Roger Rochat and his wife Susan Rochat. This program aims to eradicate maternal deaths associated with abortion

History 
Dr. Rochat a physician and an epidemiologist, has worked in more than 40 countries during his 30 years with CDC, this exposure provided him the opportunity to research around 70,000 instances of unsafe abortion and abortion-related deaths. This motivated Rochat and his wife to set up the GEMMA fund with the intention that this would inspire and support students to research in this field. They believe that through the dissemination of proper awareness for appropriate use of contraception, sex education, and with the provision for legal and safe induced abortion they could condense nearly all deaths associated with abortion.

GEMMA Seminar 
GEMMA seminar is a public-health course that solely focuses on abortion and concentrates on tackling the concerns of abortion involving medical, ethical, legal, human rights, and religious views. This course is taught by Dr.Rochat and Dr.Lathrop with other guest lecturers and is available for enrollment in each spring.

Student Grants 
Grants up to USD 700 are granted through the GEMMA awards program.

Graduate students of Emory University who possess practical research experience can apply for this scholarship through the GEMMA awards program for activities, events, research, or any programs that contribute to raising awareness and subsequently may help in the elimination of deaths associated with abortion.

Students can also avail of this scholarship to assist them in publishing their research findings or their thesis, related to this topic.

Events and Collaborations 
GEMMA provides opportunities for collaboration with various organizations like the World Health Organization, International Planned Parenthood, Global Doctors for Choice.

Every year GEMMA members actively participate in organizing various events in association with Emory Reproductive Health Association (ERHA) to promote awareness about reproductive health and justice, both at home and abroad.

Some of the events are :

·       Reproductive Justice 101

·       Breaking Our Silence: an Abortion Storytelling Event

·       Sexual & Reproductive Health Networking Night

·       ERHA and GEMMA General Body Meeting

·       Sex in the Dark

·       Film Screening: 'Reversing Roe'

·       Lunch & Learn with Megan Gordon

·       Doughnut Sale Fundraise

·       ERHA Annual Chocolate Genitalia Sale

Notable persons
M. Daniele Fallin- James W. Curran Dean of Public Health
William Foege – Professor Emeritus at Rollins School of Public Health, American epidemiologist credited for the global eradication of Smallpox.
 James W. Curran – Emeritus James W. Curran Dean of Public Health, first leader of CDC's AIDS task force.
 Howard Frumkin, MD, DrPH – former Director of the National Center for Environmental Health, former EOH department chair
 Sandra Thurman – Lecturer in the school, former Clinton "AIDS Czar"
 Carlos del Rio – Infectious disease expert who led the National AIDS Program in Mexico, Director of the NIH-sponsored HIV Prevention Trials Network, leader in global HIV/AIDS research.
 Kenneth E. Thorpe – Appointed as Deputy Assistant Secretary in President Bill Clinton's cabinet, he had a central role in coordinating President Clinton's health care reform proposals.
 Alan Hinman  – Directed the United States Immunization Program, currently the Director for Programs at the Center for Vaccine Equity at the Task Force for Global Health, one of the top five largest NGOs in the world. 
Walter Orenstein  – Also directed the United States Immunization Program and served as senior advisor to the Bill and Melinda Gates Foundation. Currently the Associate Director of the Emory Vaccines Center.

Rollins family
The school was endowed by Randall Rollins, who named it after his father, O. Wayne Rollins, a self-made business entrepreneur and innovator who participated in numerous ventures with his brother, John W. Rollins.  Several members of the Rollins family have served on the Emory University Board of Trustees.

On July 9, 2007, the O. Wayne Rollins Foundation and Grace Crum Rollins donated $50 million to the School. The donation doubled the school's physical structure, adding . It was one of the largest donations to a public health school in the history of higher education. The expansion was completed in May 2010 and the new building was dedicated on October 6, 2010.

See also
 Epi Info software program
 OpenEpi software program
 Deep Springs International, sponsor of the Gadyen Dlo safe water program that was initially a joint program between Missions of Love and Rollins in Jolivert, Haiti.  DSI's National Program Officer, Michael Ritter, a MPH graduate of Rollins.

References

External links

 

Schools of public health in the United States
Medical and health organizations based in Georgia (U.S. state)
Emory University colleges and schools
Educational institutions established in 1990
1990 establishments in Georgia (U.S. state)